The 85th Group is an inactive United States Air Force organization. Its last assignment was with United States Air Forces in Europe at Naval Air Station Keflavik, Iceland, assigned as a unit of the 48th Fighter Wing whose home station is at RAF Lakenheath, UK. It was inactivated on 28 June 2006.

Overview
The 85th Group was the United States Air Force (USAF) component of U.S. Joint Forces Command's (USJFCOM) Iceland Defense Force (IDF). the 85th Group was a tenant unit of U.S. Naval Air Station (NAS) Keflavík, strategically located on the North Atlantic Treaty Organization (NATO) base in the southwest corner of Iceland. Reactivated in 1952, the 85th Group was an Independent Group comprising seven squadrons and 13 staff agencies, with more than 1300 people assigned. Operationally, the group was assigned to the Iceland Defense Force (IDF) as part of Island Command Iceland.

As the "Guardians of the North," the 85th Group was responsible for deterring aggression in the North Atlantic, protecting Iceland's airspace and supporting contingency operations. This was accomplished through surveillance, air superiority and the use of rescue assets. The 85th Group was responsible for deterring aggression in the North Atlantic and protecting Iceland's airspace. It also supported contingency operations through surveillance, air superiority and rescue forces.

Units
 85th Operations Squadron (85th OS).  Was the air arm of the Iceland Defense Force and sole provider of Iceland's air sovereignty. It executed USACOM tasking for rotational F-15, KC-135, and HC-130 assets. It provided operational control, intelligence, total force management and maintenance of all U.S. Air Force combat aircraft in Iceland. It also provided all aerospace intelligence to IDF. Maintains organizational infrastructure and assets for U.S. Air Force contingency operations.

 The vital air defense mission were carried out by F-15 Eagle fighter aircraft of deployed temporary duty units rotating every 90 days to Iceland. While deployed to Keflavik, the F-15s were under the operational control of the 85th Operations Squadron (OS).  The 85th OS's Tanker Flight oversaw the operations of deployed KC-135 Stratotanker and HC-130 Hercules refueling aircraft.
 56th Rescue Squadron (56th RS) performed the rescue function for the 85th Group. Using HH-60 Pave Hawk helicopters, the 56th was responsible for combat rescue and reaction force response through insertion, extraction, and recovery of NATO combatants. Also known as "The Northern Lifesavers," the 56th provided continuous peacetime alert with long-range rescue capability for an area encompassing more than one million square miles and extending to the North Pole. More than 290 lives were saved since 1971 by the 56th and its predecessor, Detachment 14, 67th Aerospace and Recovery Squadron.
 932d Air Control Squadron (932d ACS) was responsible for the detection and identification of all aircraft within the Iceland Military Air Defense Identification Zone.  Using four ground-based radars and occasionally Airborne Warning and Control System (AWACS) aircraft, the 85th Group's 932nd Air Control Squadron provided air surveillance of Iceland and the North Atlantic, referred to as the Military Air Defense Identification Zone (MADIZ).  It controlled and coordinated the employment of assigned air defense forces to include fighter, tanker, and air/ground surveillance systems and coordinated with USACOM, NORAD and NATO command and control units and reported unidentified air traffic to the NCA.

History

World War II

The earliest predecessor of the 85th Group was formed during World War II as the 85th Bombardment Group, a dive bomber unit equipped with Vultee V-72 Vengeance single-engine attack aircraft. The group's original squadrons were the 305th, 306th, 307th, and 308th Bombardment Squadrons. It moved to Bowman Field, Kentucky to train for close air support and received its first aircraft there. It converted to A-24 Banshee dive bombers in August 1942 and was reassigned to Fourth Air Force in California, taking part in training maneuvers at the Desert Training Center with Army ground units programmed for the Operation Torch landings in North Africa. It continued to participate in maneuvers in California during fall and winter of 1942–1943.

The 85th returned to Third Air Force in Louisiana and re-equipped with North American A-36 Apache attack aircraft in early 1943, moving briefly to Kentucky for maneuvers. The group then moved to Georgia with Curtiss P-40 Warhawk single-engine fighter aircraft in early 1944 as a Replacement Training Unit (RTU) for fighter-bomber pilots. RTUs were oversized units designed to train replacement aircrew for assignment overseas. In late 1943, it assumed a split operation as its 500th Fighter-Bomber Squadron (FBS) moved to Harris Neck Army Air Field, Georgia and its 502d FBS moved to Punta Gorda Army Air Field, Florida, while the group and remaining squadrons remained at Waycross Army Air Field.  It received a few P-47 Thunderbolts in March 1944. It served as a RTU until it disbanded in early in 1944, when like most RTUs and Operational Training Units its personnel, equipment, and training activities at Waycross were handed over to the 345th AAF Base Unit (Replacement Training Unit, Fighter). Those at Punta Gorda became the duty of the 344th AAF Base Unit (Replacement Training Unit, Fighter) and at Harris Neck of the 346th AAF Base Unit (Replacement Training Unit, Fighter). This reorganization occurred because the AAF found that standard military units, based on relatively inflexible tables of organization were proving less well adapted to the mission.  Accordingly, a more functional system was adopted in which each base was organized into a separate numbered unit.

Cold War

The second predecessor of the 85th Group was the Iceland Air Defense Force, which replaced the Iceland Base Command, which had been the headquarters for Army (and later Air Force) units stationed in Iceland since 1942 and was assigned to Military Air Transport Service (MATS).  Between 1952 and 1961, provided air defense for Iceland, operated Keflavik Airport, and furnished base support for all U.S. military forces in Iceland. Fighters assigned to the unit routinely intercepted Soviet Union aircraft flying in the Iceland area. It performed its defense mission under North Atlantic Treaty Organization (NATO) as the Air Force component of NATO Iceland Defense Force.  Keflavik Airport was transferred to the U.S. Navy on 30 June 1961, along with base support activities.

Air Forces Iceland continued the air defense mission of Iceland as a tenant organization at Keflavik.  it was transferred from MATS to Air Defense Command in 1962; Tactical Air Command in 1978 and Air Combat Command in 1992 until it was inactivated in 1993 and replaced by the 35th Wing.  In 1994, it was consolidated with the 85th Tactical Fighter Training Wing and activated to replace the 35th Wing to serve again as the headquarters for Air Force units in Iceland, as the 85th Wing. It assumed the operational management of fighter and tanker aircraft deployed to Iceland to protect the nation's airspace. It defended U.S. national interests in the North Atlantic. In 2003, its 56th Rescue Squadron deployed to Liberia as part of Joint Task Force Liberia.  It provided a U.S. presence over the capital of Monrovia towards the end of the Second Liberian Civil War and saved lives by extracting people from the United States Embassy in Monrovia.

Air Force reductions and a new agreement with the Government of Iceland continued to affect Keflavik organizations.  On 1 March 1995, the 57th Fighter Squadron was inactivated and the interceptor force was replaced by Regular Air Force and Air National Guard F-15 Eagle fighter aircraft rotating every 90 days to Iceland. The 85th Wing was reduced to a Group level in 1995 and supported rotational deployments.  In 2002 jurisdiction of Air Force units in Iceland was transferred to the United States Air Forces in Europe.

The 85th Group continued to support rotational deployments until it was inactivated during a one-hour, formal ceremony on 28 June 2006, as a result of the Air Force reduction in forces in Iceland. All rotational fighters left and the 56th Rescue Squadron ceased operation at the end of the fiscal year.

Lineage
85th Fighter-Bomber Group
 Constituted as 85th Bombardment Group (Light) on 13 January 1942
 Activated on 10 February 1942
 Redesignated as 85th Bombardment Group (Dive) on 27 July 1942
 Redesignated as 85th Fighter-Bomber Group on 10 August 1943
 Disbanded on 1 May 1944
 Reconstituted on 31 July 1985 and redesignated as 85th Tactical Fighter Training Wing (not active)
 Consolidated with Air Forces Iceland on 29 September 1994 as 85th Wing

Air Forces Iceland
 Designated as Iceland Air Defense Force and organized, on 1 April 1952
 Redesignated Air Forces Iceland on 1 January 1960
 Inactivated on 31 May 1993
 Consolidated with 85th Tactical Fighter Wing on 29 September 1994 as 85th Wing

Consolidated Unit
 Activated on 1 October 1994
 Redesignated 85th Group on 1 July 1995
 Inactivated on 28 June 2006.

Assignments

 3d Air Support Command, 10 February 1942
 III Bomber Command, 16 March 1942
 XII Bomber Command, 2 May 1942
 III Bomber Command, 8 May 1942
 III Ground Air Support Command (later, III Air Support Command), 10 August 1942
 IV Air Support Command, 2 November 1942
 Desert Training Center, 21 January 1943
 III Air Support Command, 8 April 1943
 23d Bombardment Training Wing, 10 April 1943
 III Fighter Command, 6 August 1943 – 1 May 1944
 Military Air Transport Service, 1 April 1952

 64th Air Division, 1 July 1962
 26th Air Division, 1 July 1963
 Goose Air Defense Sector, 4 September 1963
 37th Air Division, 1 April 1966
 21st Air Division, 31 December 1969
 Aerospace Defense Command, 1 October 1975
 Tactical Air Command, 1 October 1979
 First Air Force, 6 December 1985 – 31 May 1993
 Eighth Air Force, 1 October 1994
 Third Air Force, 1 October 2002
 48th Fighter Wing, 8 October 2004 – 28 June 2006.

Components

Operational Components
Divisions
 65th Air Division, 24 April 1952 – 8 March 1954

Groups
 85th Operations Group, 1 October 1994 – 1 July 1995
 1400th Operations Group, 18 December 1955 – 1 July 1960

Squadrons
 56th Rescue Squadron, 1 July 1995 – 28 June 2006
 57th Fighter-Interceptor Squadron, 13 November 1954 – 18 December 1955; 1 July 1960 – 31 May 1993
 85th Operations Support Squadron (later 85th Operations Squadron), 1 July 1985 – 28 June 2006
 305th Bombardment Squadron (later 499th Fighter-Bomber Squadron), 10 February 1942 – 1 May 1944
 Located at Harris Neck AAF. Georgia after 11 December 1943.
 306th Bombardment Squadron (later 500th Fighter-Bomber Squadron), 10 February 1942 – 1 May 1944
 307th Bombardment Squadron (later 501st Fighter-Bomber Squadron), 10 February 1942 – 1 May 1944
 308th Bombardment Squadron (later 502d Fighter-Bomber Squadron), 10 February 1942 – 1 May 1944
 Located at Punta Gorda AAF, Florida after 3 December 1943 (detached to 337th Fighter Group).
 667th Aircraft Control and Warning Squadron, 1 July 1960 – 30 September 1988
 932d Aircraft Control and Warning Squadron (later 932d Air Defense Squadron, 932d Air Control Squadron), 8 March 1954 – 18 December 1955; 1 July 1960 – 31 May 1993; 1 July 1995 – 28 July 2006
 933d Aircraft Control and Warning Squadron, 18 April 1955 – 18 December 1955; 1 July 1960 – 8 October 1960
 934th Aircraft Control and Warning Squadron, 1 July 1960 – 8 October 1960

Support Components
Groups
 85th Support Group, 1 October 1994 – 1 July 1995
 1400th Air Base Group, 1 April 1952 – 1 July 1960
 1400th Maintenance & Supply Group, 1 May 1959 – 1 July 1960
 1400th USAF Hospital, 1 July 1960 – 1 October 1961

Squadrons

 85th Civil Engineer Squadron, 1 July 1985 – 28 June 2006
 85th Logistics Squadron, 1 July 1985 – ca. 30 September 2002
 85th Mission Support Squadron, 1 July 1985 – 28 June 2006
 85th Security Forces Squadron, 1 July 1985 – 28 June 2006
 1400th Air Base Squadron, 1 July 1960 – 1 October 1961
 1400th Civil Engineering Squadron, 1 July 1960 – 1 October 1961

 1400th Consolidated Aircraft Maintenance Squadron, 1 July 1960 – 1 July 1961
 1400th Supply Squadron, 1 July 1960 – 1 October 1961
 1400th Support Squadron, 1 July 1960 – 1 July 1962
 1400th Transportation Squadron, 1 July 1960 – 1 October 1961
 4557th Security Police Squadron, ca. 1985 – 31 May 1993
 4557th Supply Squadron, 1 March 1987 – 31 May 1993

Stations

 Army Air Base, Savannah, Georgia, 10 February 1942
 Bowman Field, Kentucky, c. 16 February 1942
 Hunter Field, Georgia, 9 June 1942
 Waycross Army Air Field, Georgia, 15 August 1942
 Gillespie Field, Tennessee, 3 October 1942
 Blythe Army Air Base, California, 2 November 1942

 Rice Army Air Field, California, c. 11 December 1942
 Camp Young, California, 21 January 1943
 Harding Field, Louisiana, 8 April 1943
 Waycross Army Air Field, Georgia, c. 27 August 1943 – 1 May 1944
 Keflavik Airport, Iceland, 1 April 1952 – 31 May 1993
 NAS Keflavik, Iceland, 1 October 1994 – 28 June 2006.

Aircraft

 Vultee V-72, 1942;
 A-24 Banshee, 1942–1943;
 A-36 Apache, 1943–1944;
 P-40 Warhawk, 1944;
 P-47 Thunderbolt, 1944.
 F-51 Mustang (rotational aircraft), 1952–1953;
 F-89 Scorpion, 1954–1962;
 F-102 Delta Dagger, 1962–1973;

 F-4 Phantom II, 1973–1985;
 F-15 Eagle, 1985–1993; 1994–1995; (rotational aircraft), 1995–2006
 HH-60 Pave Hawk, 1994–2006
 KC-135 Stratotanker (rotational aircraft), 1994–2006
 HC-130P/N (rotational aircraft), 1994–2006
 F-16 Fighting Falcon (rotational aircraft), 1997 and 1999.

Awards
 Air Force Outstanding Unit Award
 

 1 June 1967 – 31 December 1968
 1 January 1969 – 31 December 1969
 1 January 1970 – 31 August 1970
 1 July 1973 – 30 June 1975
 1 July 1975 – 30 June 1976

 1 July 1976 – 30 June 1978
 1 July 1981 – 30 June 1982
 1 October 1994 – 31 May 1996
 1 June 1996 – 31 May 1997

 1 June 1997 – 31 May 1998
 1 June 1999 – 31 May 1999
 1 June 2000 – 31 May 2001
 1 June 2001 – 31 May 2002

 1 June 2002 – 30 September 2003
 1 October 2003 – 30 September 2004
 1 October 2004 – 31 October 2005
 1 October 2005 – 28 June 2006

 Air Force Organizational Excellence Award
 
 1 July 1985 – 30 June 1987
 1 July 1987 – 30 June 1988
 1 July 1990 – 31 May 1992
 American Theater of World War II

See also

 List of United States Air Force aircraft control and warning squadrons

Notes and references

External links
 USAF Press Release: Drawdown at Keflavik (25 May 2006)

085
Military units and formations established in 1995